Semantic Spaces is the seventh studio album by Canadian industrial/electronic music group Delerium in 1994. Guest musicians on the album include Greg Reely and Kristy Thirsk. Kristy Thirsk was dubbed "The Voice of Delerium" for providing vocals to "Flowers Become Screens", "Incantation", "Metamorphosis" and "Flatlands".

Both "Flowers Become Screens" and "Incantation" have music videos. The track "Flatlands" was featured on the TV series The Sentinel, in the first season episode "Vow of Silence".

Track listing
"Flowers Become Screens" – 7:55
"Metaphor" – 7:47
"Resurrection" – 9:25
"Incantation" – 6:21
"Consensual Worlds" – 10:07
"Metamorphosis" – 8:26
"Flatlands" – 7:13
"Sensorium" – 12:05
"Gateway" – 8:05

References

Delerium albums
1994 albums
Nettwerk Records albums